The Battle of Shuangqiaozhen was fought from March 6 to March 12, 1931, between the 34th Division of the Army of the Kuomintang Nationalist Government and the Red Army of the Chinese Communist Party. The commander of the 34th Division, Major General Yue (a descendant of Song Dynasty general Yue Fei) was captured by the communists. In August 1932, Yue was executed by firing squad on the orders of Zhang Guotao and posthumously promoted to full general.

Bibliography
中華民國國防大學編，《中國現代軍事史主要戰役表》[1]（台灣國防部史政檔案開放應用系統）
原中華民國國軍政戰學校、美軍顧問團史政處，《中國現代軍事史主要戰役表-陸軍》

Conflicts in 1931
Battles of the Chinese Civil War